The North Fork Trinity River is a tributary of the Trinity River in the U.S. state of California. Important tributaries include the East Fork North Fork Trinity River and Grizzly Creek.

External links
Steelhead in the North Fork Trinity River
USGS discharge data

Rivers of Trinity County, California
Rivers of Northern California
Wild and Scenic Rivers of the United States